The Caluequee Dam, is an operational multipurpose dam across the Kunene River, in Kunene Province, in southwestern Angola. The dam stores water for the  Ruacana Hydroelectric Power Station, in neighboring Namibia. Its waters are also used for the irrigation of farmland, both in Angola and Namibia.

Location

The geographical coordinates of Calueque Dam are 17°16'22.0"S, 14°32'40.0"E (Latitude:-17.272778; Longitude:14.544444).

History
In October 1964, representatives of the government of Portugal and the government of South Africa met in Lisbon, Portugal and signed agreements relating to the construction of dams on the Kunene River, thereby controlling the rate of flow of the river and maximizing electricity output at the dams. The agreements also related to maximizing the availability of water for use by humans and animals in Angola and South West Africa (now Namibia). The agreements spelt out who owned what and who would construct, operate and pay for (a) Gove Dam (b) Calueque Dam and the associated Gove Hydroelectric Power Station and the Ruacana Hydroelectric Power Station.

Construction of the Calueque Dam started in 1972. Work on the dam was abandoned in 1976 due to the Angolan Civil War. At the time construction stopped in 1976, approximately 70 percent of the civil works had been completed and the dam could provide some water for human and animal use. In 1988, "an attack" severely damaged the incomplete structure.

Repairs and optimization
In 2012, repairs and refurbishment of the partially complete dam commenced. Rehabilitation work was concluded in 2015.

See also

 Energy in Angola

References

External links
 Upgrading dam infrastructure in Angola As of 11 March 2014.

Dams in Angola
Cunene Province
Energy infrastructure completed in 2015
2015 establishments in Angola